Christell Jazmín Rodriguez Carrillo  (born January 2, 1998 in Talcahuano) is a Chilean child singer. She became known in the popular Chilean TV Show called "Rojo Fama Contrafama" imitating to the young singer Maria Jose Quintanilla in a contest. She has recorded three albums since then. She was nominated for the Grammy Latino by her second record production.

Biography
Only daughter of Christian Rodriguez and Myriam Carrillo, both members of the musical Christian group "Misterio Musical Evangelística Piedra Viva", Christell grew up with music around her. As her mother says "Christell from a very young age felt interest for the music, beginning not only singing, but playing some instruments and dancing". At the age of two, Christell took part in a festival of tambourines and percussion. Her father comments that "In the tambourine goes her rhythmic base and the times to enter to a song". Then and until years later, Christell continued accompanying her parents in musical presentations at their church playing the tambourine. At the age of four she took part in a children's festival with an original song called "Mom told a story". That same year she collaborated in a Christian dance group.

Her artistic career began at the age of 5, on July 1, 2003, when she competed in a contest made by the TV show "Rojo Fama Contrafama" in one of their galas. This gala was in the city Talcahuano and its purpose was to find the "double" of Maria Jose Quintanilla (member of the TV show "Rojo Fama Contrafama"), that is, another girl who could sing or resembles to the young singer who was known for her Mexican repertory. Christell sang the popular song "Mexico Lindo y Querido" and captured the hearts of the audience winning the contest. The five-year-old singer captures the heart of the nation.

Christell went on the show "Rojo...", singing popular Mexican songs which were also in Maria Jose Quintanilla's album. At five years old she sang songs like La Bikina, La Mochila Azul, Cielito Lindo, among others. After a few months and after an agreement with the Warner Music Group, the young singer recorded an album, and in November of that year, she launched her first album which in one day sold more than eight thousand copies. After a week she reached platinum and then eight platinum discs.

"Mueve el Ombligo" (Move your navel) was the hit single from the album, which reached top1 on national radios for weeks becoming "the summer hit". The song was so popular that today it is a classic.

After this success she recorded two more albums, and even though the sale phenomenon from the first one was not repeated, both albums were successful, reaching five and two platinum discs respectively.

In 2005 Christell began a tour in Mexico, Puerto Rico and on the Latin communities of the USA, like Miami and Los Angeles, where she launched a special-edition-album with her greatest hits. During this tour the young singer earned a gold disc for more than 50,000 copies sold in Mexica. In November Christell was nominated to the Grammy Latino by her second album "La Fiesta Continua" at seven years old.

In 2006 she took part in the TV show "La Movida del Festival" of Channel 13, (Chile) as a "Commentator" of the Viña del Mar International Song Festival. Her role was to give her opinion and point of view on this festival. This way, at eight years old, Christell became the youngest person ever on commenting the biggest Latin American Festival.

Due to her success, Doce Company signed a contract with her manager to create a cartoon with Christell's image becoming the first artist in Chile to have a cartoon. The project included a clothing line, toys, school and selfcare products and a cartoon TV series, everything carrying the cartoon image of the young singer.

After a disagreement between the parents of the singer and her manager, the entire project was canceled and only a few products and clothes were on sale for a while since the agency could not cancel them. The parents claimed they canceled the contract because the manager agency had plans for the young singer that had not been discussed with them with the intention of taking monetary advantage.  In the end they signed a contract with Multimusica Company.

After an almost two-year-long pause (2006–2007), Christell re-appeared on 2008 as a ten-year-old actress on the Chilean TV channel Chilevision doing live theatre in the Theatre in Chilevision. In November of that year, she sang on the First Christian Music Festival.

Since then, Christell has appeared in many TV shows like "Animal Nocturno"(2008), "Theatre in Chilevision"(2008–2009), "La Movida del Festival"(2010), "Viva La Mañana"(2010), "Acoso Textual"(2010), "Calle 7"(2011), "Buenos dias a Todos"(2011).

Christell has not recorded a new album since her third one in 2004 at 7 years old, but she says her career has not stopped since she has kept singing, making concerts, composing new songs, playing different instruments and appearing on different TV shows where she is invited.

Discography

Albums

Singles

Covers

Other products

Tours
During 2005 she made trips to Mexico, the United States and Puerto Rico to promote her career where an album was launched with the greatest hits of her first two albums. 

Other important steps during her visit to Mexico was taking part in TV programmes such as " In Family with Chabelo". Christell also visited radio and TV studios, gave interviews to the press and took part in the children's show Sonric'slandia. During this tour she received as gold disc for more than 50,000 copies sold in Mexico.

Videography

Awards

Grammy Latino 

At seven years old Christell became the youngest singer to be nominated to a Grammy (this award (Latin and Anglo Grammy) had never nominated a child in any of its categories).

Calama incident 

During the summer of 2004, on February 21, while Christell was giving a show in Calama city, she began to feel stomach discomfort and her father asked her for one more song to calm the people (who were hooting for the show to continue). This situation was recorded by Andrea Espinoza, who went to the show with her daughter. She said she felt very bad to see the girl singing while she was sick and that was the reason why she had decided to publicize the video.

The exhibition of the tape unleashed all kinds of reactions, including the possibility of exploitation by the father. The father of the artist recognized he had committed a mistake and said: "It was my mistake on not having measured how sick she was feeling... I've should have listened to my wife who told me that Christell shouldn't act".

Christell was taken to Calama's medical center that morning where "they did a stable diagnosis to her. In the evening she was good and energetic as always and she did want to sing. Then she started feeling bad again, but it was during the show and we take her again to the clinic ". He added: " It was a mistake to ask Christell for another song, but I did it because I couldn't handle the situation neither the pressure of the audience. It wasn't to ask her, but to give her an idea to get out of the situation, it was a mistake not to be able to handle the pressure of the people. I do not want to be seen as an exploiter for this".

TVN the TV show Rojo Fama Contrafama and particularly Rafael Araneda (the entertainer of the TV show) clarified they did not know of the situation, and though they had a conversation with the parents of little girl after the incident, Araneda clarified that the girl never had a saturated agenda and assured that singing is only a game for her, and that her parents have never forced her to go on the stage.  [TVN] and the program (Rojo Fama Contrafama) which was read by Rafael Araneda in the program where they clarify they always protected the integrity of the little girl:

"In the presentation to the press of the new season of "Rojo Fama Contrafama", a position of the tvshow was requested opposite to Christell Rodríguez's private artistic performances, in the opportunity it was said that the topic would be approached in the tvshow ... today after knowing the video that shows to the evidently sick girl and being incited to continue with the show organized in Calama city, we demonstrate our more absolute rejection, to actions of this kind that commit an outrage against the fundamental rights of the girl".

"For our part we have the most absolute conviction that the relation that Christell has had with the tvshow Rojo Fama Contrafama adjusts completely to the law that recognizes the artistic activities of the young girl. In Christell's concrete case it is necessary to emphasize that her participation in the tvshow has been designed in such a way of respecting and protecting the own needs of her age ... ".

After the case was investigated by the National Service of Minors (SENAME), they concluded there was no intent of exploitation of any kind. The topic was closed and Christell continued with her normal activities and her artistic career.

References

External links 
Christell videos in Youtube

1998 births
Living people
People from Talcahuano
Chilean Christians
21st-century Chilean women singers
Chilean child singers
Women in Latin music